Wailing Wall is a controversial term for the Western Wall of the Temple Mount in Jerusalem.

Wailing Wall may also refer to:

Wailing Wall (band), a psychedelic rock band
Wailing Wall, an album by the band
Wailing Wall (Melbourne), an historic wall where wharf labourers congregated

See also
The artist Wyland's murals of whales on the sides of buildings have been dubbed "Whaling Walls"